Eigil Pedersen (23 May 1917 – 2 August 1994), was a Danish chess player, three-times Danish Chess Championship winner (1951, 1953, 1961).

Biography
In the 1950s and 1960s Eigil Pedersen was one of the strongest Danish chess players. Nine times he won medals at the Danish Chess Championships: three gold (1951, 1953, 1961), three silver (1957, 1960, 1964) and three bronze (1949, 1954, 1956). In 1952, Eigil Pedersen won a small match against the future chess grandmaster Bent Larsen.

Eigil Pedersen played for Denmark in the Chess Olympiads:
 In 1950, at third board in the 9th Chess Olympiad in Dubrovnik (+5, =4, -4),
 In 1952, at fourth board in the 10th Chess Olympiad in Helsinki (+5, =3, -6),
 In 1956, at third board in the 12th Chess Olympiad in Moscow (+3, =4, -4),
 In 1958, at fourth board in the 13th Chess Olympiad in Munich (+3, =4, -5),
 In 1966, at second reserve board in the 17th Chess Olympiad in Havana (+1, =0, -4).

Eigil Pedersen played for Denmark in the European Team Chess Championship:
 In 1970, at eight board in the 4th European Team Chess Championship in Kapfenberg (+1, =0, -3).

References

External links

Eigil Pedersen chess games at 365chess.com

1917 births
1994 deaths
Sportspeople from Aarhus
Danish chess players
Chess Olympiad competitors
20th-century chess players